Dr Vajiranath Lakshman De Silva (Sinhala:වජිරනාත් ලක්ෂ්මන් ද සිල්වා)  is the founder of Saukyadana Movement of Sri Lanka.

Early life and education
Vajiranath who received his education from Nalanda College, Colombo graduated as a Medical Doctor by obtaining MBBS degree University of Colombo's Medical Faculty and later further studied at University of London.

Saukyadana Movement 
Whilst on a pilgrimage to Sri Pada (Sri Lanka) in 1959 by Dr Vajiranath he observed the difficulties that pilgrims faced along the trek and as a result he decided to set up the voluntary medical assistance unit to help them paving the way to establish the Saukyadana Movement of Sri Lanka being established in March 1960.

References

 
 

 

 
 

Sri Lankan Buddhists
Sinhalese physicians
Alumni of Nalanda College, Colombo
1929 births
2010 deaths